Carl G. Washburne Memorial State Park is a state park in the U.S. state of Oregon, administered by the Oregon Parks and Recreation Department. This park is in Lane County near Florence and Yachats. Very scenic wide beach, great for dogs, kids, kites. Some areas nearby are SNOWY PLOVER protected breeding areas, where dogs are banned, so be careful to keep dogs leashed if uncertain, and always in the State Park itself.

Hobbit Trail

See also
 List of Oregon state parks

References

External links
 

State parks of Oregon
Parks in Lane County, Oregon